AVB-7.62 is a battle rifle designed by Anatoly F. Baryshev that is derived from his weapon operating system. It is characterized by significantly reduced recoil.

Variants

AB-7.62 and AB-5.45 
The rifle shares nearly 2/3s of its common parts with the AKM and AK-74. The 5.45 version was not developed due to the futility of already low-powered 5.45 cartridges that are not needed to reduce recoil.

The weapon externally differs from the AKMS only in the absence of a gas tube (a carrying handle is installed instead) and a different stock design. Due to such small differences, their balancing is almost the same, although the folding butt is undoubtedly more convenient than AKMS's, but the difference in shooting is significant: the recoil is almost not noticeable, the barrel isn't thrown up, its point of impact is maintained, and the direction of shooting is maintained without effort. Because the 7.62 mm assault rifle cartridge is a softer shooting cartridge, the advantages of the new design become apparent to the shooter after more than one hundred rounds.
According to its tactical characteristics, the AB-1(AB-7.62) has almost no difference from the AKM, but it allows the user to perform much more accurate automatic firing at a greater distance.

Derivatives

KPB-12.7 and ARGB-85

The ARGB-85 is a 30mm automatic grenade launcher which uses standard VOG-17 grenades. 
The KPB-12.7 is based on the ARGB-85 and chambered with 12.7×108mm cartridge. It was not to be interested due to its constructive analogy with the ARGB-85.
 
Test results showed great recoil reduction, making it easily usable as a small arm with half of weight of the pre-existing AGS-17.

Because of Baryshev recoil-reducing operation, this weapon can be fired from the shoulder, but it still has drawbacks that are common with all other Baryshev weapons – insufficient reliability and inferior accuracy when performing single shots more so than conventional weapon mechanisms.

RAG 30 is an (unlicensed) prototype, with ammunition feeding supplied from the magazine located on top of the receiver, thus it is possible to replenish the magazine without removing it.

See also 
 AEK-971
 AK-107
 Kord machine gun
 AGS-30
 List of Russian weaponry
 List of firearms

References

External links
Modernfirearms
Baryshev rifle video
 Still with no recoil - Baryshev Weapon Systems (in Russian).
 Demonstration tests in military unit 68665 by the Armed Forces of the Republic of Kazakhstan (in Russian)

Assault rifles of the Soviet Union
Trial and research firearms of the Soviet Union